The 1906 Yale Bulldogs football team was an American football team that represented Yale University as an independent during the 1906 college football season. The team compiled a 9–0–1 record, shut out nine of ten opponents, and outscored all opponents by a total of 144 to 7. Four Yale players were selected as consensus All-Americans, and the team was retroactively selected by multiple selectors as the national champion for 1906.

National championship claim
There was no contemporaneous system in 1906 for determining a national champion. However, several selectors (the Billingsley Report, Caspar Whitney, and Parke H. Davis) have retroactively named Yale as the national champion. Other selectors (Helms, NCF) chose Princeton as the national champion. Yale and Princeton both finished with undefeated seasons and played each other to a 0–0 tie on November 17, 1906.

Key players
Four Yale players were among the eleven selected as consensus first-team players on the 1906 All-America team. Yale's four consensus All Americans were: halfback William F. Knox; fullback Paul Veeder; end Robert Forbes; and tackle Lucius Horatio Biglow. Five other Yale players receiving All-American honors were quarterback Tad Jones, fullback Samuel F. B. Morse, center Clarence Hockenberger, end Clarence Alcott, and Arthur Brides.

The 1906 college football season was a year of change. Following controversies in 1905 over the increase of violence and professionalism in college football, a number of rule changes were implemented in 1906. The most lasting change introduced in 1906 was the forward pass. Yale's Paul Veeder and Bob Forbes combined for one of the first important pass plays, a play described in one history of the game as follows: "The only other significant pass that season was thrown by Yale, which gained a first down that led to victory over Harvard, when Paul Veeder threw thirty yards to Bob Forbes."

Schedule

References

Yale
Yale Bulldogs football seasons
College football national champions
College football undefeated seasons
Yale Bulldogs football